The LKF Cup was an annual national domestic cup competition for Lithuanian professional basketball teams. It was organised by the Lithuanian Basketball Federation (Lietuvos Krepšinio Federacija - LKF). The competition's full name was Lietuvos Krepšinio Federacija Taurė (English: Lithuanian Basketball Federation Cup). Before 2007, the LKF Cup wasn't held regularly, but after that, its finals were organised every January, February, or March.

Between 2007 and 2014, the competition was played between teams from the LKL, the NKL, and the RKL. In 2015, the LKF decided to change the competition format, and it was then played between the top eight qualified teams of the LKL, after the first half of the season.

Only three teams, (Žalgiris, Lietuvos rytas, and Prienai) won the cup.

The competition was replaced in 2016, by the King Mindaugas Cup.

Winners

Before 2007

Since 2007

Absences

Performance by club (since 2007)

Lithuanian Supercup (2012–2013 season) 
In the 2012–13 season, Lietuvos Rytas and Žalgiris organized a separate competition, called the Lithuanian Supercup. Two games were played in September 2012: the first one, in Kaunas, was won by Žalgiris, 89–71, and in the second leg, in Vilnius, both teams tied 87–87. Žalgiris won the Supercup by an overall aggregate score of 176–158.

See also
LKL
LKL MVP
LKL Finals
LKL Finals MVP
King Mindaugas Cup
King Mindaugas Cup MVP
List of Lithuanian basketball league champions
Basketball in Lithuania

References

External links 
 Official LKL website
 Official LKL YouTube.com channel
 Lithuanian league at Eurobasket.com

 
Basketball cup competitions in Lithuania
2007 establishments in Lithuania
Defunct basketball cup competitions in Europe
2015 disestablishments in Lithuania
Recurring sporting events established in 2007
Recurring sporting events disestablished in 2015